Jamil Roberts (born 14 June 1998) is an English professional footballer who currently plays for Australian club Peninsula Power FC in the National Premier Leagues Queensland. He previously played college soccer for Marshall University.

Youth career 
Prior to college, Roberts played in England for the Plymouth Argyle F.C. under-18 team. He also attended Ivybridge Community College.

College and amateur career 
In 2017, his first season, Roberts appeared in 18 matches as a freshman, and became a mainstay in the starting lineup as a freshman. As a sophomore in 2018, Roberts scored five goals in 18 appearances for the Thundering Herd. He was also named the Conference USA Offensive Player of the Week in early November. In 2019, Roberts played in 18 matches, scoring eight times. He was named to the All-Conference USA second team. As a result of the COVID-19 pandemic, the 2020 season was postponed to the spring, with the NCAA Tournament also to be played in the spring. Ahead of the spring season, Roberts was drafted by Sporting Kansas City 77th overall in the 2021 MLS SuperDraft. However, he decided to stay at Marshall for his senior season. In the spring 2020 season, Roberts scored 2 goals in 13 regular season games. However, he came alive in the NCAA Tournament, scoring a goal in three straight games for Marshall (vs. Georgetown, vs. North Carolina, and vs. Indiana) to propel them to their first ever National Championship win.

Whilst at college, Roberts also played in the USL League Two, appearing for West Virginia Alliance FC in 2019.

Professional career

Sporting Kansas City II 
Sporting Kansas City selected Roberts with the 77th overall pick in the 2021 MLS Draft. After deferring joining the organization until after his senior season at Marshall, Roberts signed with the club's USL Championship affiliate Sporting Kansas City II on 1 July 2021. Roberts made his professional debut with the club on 10 July 2021 in a 1–0 victory over Atlanta United 2 when he subbed in during the 67th minute. He scored his first professional goal on 12 August 2021 in a 4–2 loss vs. Birmingham Legion FC. He went on to make 16 appearances and scored 2 goals for the club. Following the 2021 season, Kansas City opted to declined their contract option on Roberts.

Tormenta FC 
On 25 March 2022, Tormenta FC announced that it had signed Roberts for the 2022 USL League One season. Roberts made his debut for Tormenta coming on for Alex Morrell in the 69th minute of a 1–0 loss to North Carolina FC. Roberts gained his first assist for the club in a 2–0 win against Birmingham Legion in the U.S. Open Cup. On 6 November 2022, Roberts came on in the 78th minute in the 2022 USL League One Final against the Chattanooga Red Wolves to score the winning goal in a 2–1 victory. On 7 December 2022, it was announced that Tormenta FC had declined Roberts option to bring him back for the 2023 season.

Peninsula Power 
After leaving Tormenta FC, Roberts joined National Premier Leagues Queensland side Peninsula Power in Australia on a two-year deal ahead of the 2023 season. Roberts made his debut for Peninsula Power in a 2–1 loss against Sunshine Coast Wanderers, starting and playing 58 minutes.

Career statistics

Honours

College 
Marshall Thundering Herd
Conference USA regular season: 2019, 2020
Conference USA Men's Soccer Tournament: 2019
NCAA Division I Men's Soccer Tournament: 2020

Individual 
NCAA Men's Division I Offensive MOP Award: 2020

Professional

South Georgia Tormenta 

 USL League One Championship: 2022

References

External links 
 Marshall Thundering Herd bio

1998 births
Living people
Association football forwards
English expatriate sportspeople in Australia
English expatriate sportspeople in the United States
English footballers
Expatriate soccer players in Australia
Expatriate soccer players in the United States
Marshall Thundering Herd men's soccer players
NCAA Division I Men's Soccer Tournament Most Outstanding Player winners
People from Langport
Plymouth Argyle F.C. players
Sporting Kansas City draft picks
Sporting Kansas City II players
Tormenta FC players
USL League One players
USL League Two players